Juan José Muñante López (12 June 1948 – 23 April 2019) was a Peruvian footballer who played in a right winger role.

Biography
Nicknamed The Jet in Peru and The Cobra in Mexico. He was famous for having great speed (he could run 100 metres in 10.7 seconds flat and was almost as quick with a ball at his feet), and also for his skills with the ball and his relatively high assist for teammate for passing the ball to the scorer, given his position of right winger.

He debuted in the Primera División with Sport Boys in the 1966 season. In 1969, he joined Universitario de Deportes where he was part of the team that won 2 Peru league championships and he helped reach second place at the Copa Libertadores 1972.

Muñante also played successfully in the Mexican League for many years, mainly in Pumas de la UNAM and Atlético Español.

Muñante played 48 times for the Peru national football team between 1967 and 1978, including participation in the 1978 FIFA World Cup.

On 23 April 2019, Muñante died of lung cancer in the U.S. state of Florida, at the age of 70.

Honours

Universitario de Deportes
Peruvian League
Winner (2): 1969, 1971
Runner-up (2): 1970, 1972
Copa Libertadores
Runner-up (1): 1972

Atlético Español
CONCACAF Champions League
Winner (1): 1975
Primera División Mexicana
Runner-up (1): 1973-74

Pumas de la UNAM
Primera División Mexicana
Winner (1): 1976-77
Runner-up (2): 1977–78, 1978–79

References

External links
 
CONCACAF Champions' Cup 1975

1948 births
2019 deaths
People from Pisco, Peru
Association football wingers
Peruvian footballers
Peru international footballers
1978 FIFA World Cup players
Sport Boys footballers
Club Universitario de Deportes footballers
Atlético Español footballers
Club Universidad Nacional footballers
Tampico Madero F.C. footballers
Peruvian Primera División players
Liga MX players
Peruvian expatriate footballers
Expatriate footballers in Mexico
Peruvian expatriate sportspeople in Mexico
Deaths from lung cancer in Florida